Ni Tian (Chinese: 倪田; 1855–1919), born as Baotian, courtesy name Mogeng, sobriquet as Modaoren and Biyuehezhu, was a Chinese painter in Qing Dynasty and Republic Period.

1855 births
1919 deaths
Qing dynasty painters
Republic of China painters
Painters from Yangzhou